The Rule of Law Conditionality Regulation is a regulation of the European Union and Euratom, which allows the European Commission to adopt measures, including the suspension of payment of funds from the EU budget, to member states which violate the principles of rule of law enshrined in article 2 of the Treaty on European Union.

Legislative background 

Democratic backsliding in Hungary and Poland has been a major concern for the European Union since the 2010s. In December 2017, the European Commission initiated article 7 suspension proceedings against Poland, and in September 2018, the European Parliament did the same against Hungary. The proceedings have since stalled, however, as a suspension of a member state under article 7 requires unanimity, excluding the member state concerned, and Hungary and Poland are widely expected to veto each other's suspension.

As a solution to this problem, the European Commission proposed in May 2018 to link disbursements from the European Union's budget to adherence to rule of law standards by means of a regulation. The European Parliament adopted a position on the Commission's proposal in April 2019, but the Council was generally wary of confronting its members from Poland and Hungary.

This changed during the adoption of the 2021–2027 Multiannual Financial Framework (MFF) and the Next Generation EU (NGEU) recovery package in the summer of 2020. At the July 2020 European Council summit, the heads of state and government of the EU member states agreed that these funds should be tied to a conditionality regime regarding the rule of law. Germany, holding the presidency of the Council, suggested a compromise on the rule of law conditionality regulation proposed by the Commission and European Parliament in September 2020. After trilogue meetings between the Council, the European Parliament, and the Commission, a legislative draft of the regulation was published on 5 November 2020.

Although the regulation could be adopted by the Council by a qualified majority, Hungary and Poland threatened to veto the Own Resources Decision, which defines how the MFF and NGEU are financed. At the European Council summit of 10 and 11 December 2020, the impasse was resolved by adopting a series of declarations on how the Rule of Law Conditionality Regulation should be adopted, implemented and interpreted. This paved the way for the adoption of the regulation by the Council on 14 December 2020 and by the European Parliament on 16 December 2020.

Provisions 
The regulation provides for the Commission to propose measures against a member state that violates the principles of the rule of law. These measures include the suspension of payments or commitments, and a prohibition on entering into new legal commitments.

In the context of the regulation, the rule of law is understood to refer to the values enshrined in article 2 of the Treaty on European Union, and include "the principles of legality implying a transparent, accountable, democratic and pluralistic law-making process; legal certainty; prohibition of arbitrariness of the executive powers; effective judicial protection, including access to justice, by independent and impartial courts, also as regards fundamental rights; separation of powers; and non-discrimination and equality before the law".

Article 4 of the regulation specifies that measures may only be taken if the violations of the rule of law "affect or seriously risk affecting the sound financial management of the Union budget or the protection of the financial interests of the Union in a sufficiently direct way".

Implementation 
The declaratory statements adopted at the European Council summit of 10 and 11 December 2020 address how the European Council views the regulation should be implemented. The legal value of these declaratory statements is disputed.

According to the European Council's declaratory statements, the Commission should not only develop guidelines for the application of the regulation, but also await the outcome of legal challenges to the regulation before implementing it. Furthermore, the Commission should only apply the regulation when there are no more efficient means to protect the Union's budget.

The European Parliament adopted a resolution on 25 March 2021 in which it stressed "that the application of the Rule of Law Conditionality Regulation cannot be subject to the adoption of guidelines", urging "the Commission to avoid any further delay in its application" and "to keep Parliament regularly informed about all ongoing investigations into breaches of the principles of the rule of law which could affect, or seriously risk affecting, the sound financial management of the Union budget in a sufficiently direct way". The European Parliament threatened to take legal action against the Commission if it would not provide such information to the European Parliament by 1 June 2021. 

On 10 June 2021, after the deadline had passed without the Commission providing the European Parliament with the necessary information, the European Parliament adopted another resolution, calling on the Commission to fulfil its obligations under the Rule of Law Conditionality Regulation within two weeks, and notifying the Commission that it would start preparations for legal action against the Commission for failure to act (article 265 TFEU). The European Commission rejected the ultimatum on 23 August 2021 with a five-page letter.

Legal challenges 
On 11 March 2021, Hungary and Poland separately launched legal proceedings with the European Court of Justice against the European Parliament and the Council for adopting the regulation, asking the court to annul the regulation as, according to Hungary and Poland, the regulation does not have an appropriate legal basis and that it serves to circumvent the punitive mechanism built in the Article 7 of the Treaty on European Union. The advocate general advised the Court to dismiss those challenges on 2 December 2021. The ECJ ultimately dismissed both countries' complaints and ruled the regulation fully compatible with the Treaty and not exceeding the competences of the European Union; however, the court said that any suspension of funds must not only relate to the EU law violations but also have a tangible effect on jeopardising the correct implementation of the EU budget in the member state.

Notes

References 
 

2020 in law
2020 in the European Union
Budget of the European Union
European Union regulations